David Marc Chalian (born July 20, 1973) is an American journalist and political analyst who serves as political director for the American cable news channel CNN.

Early life and education
Chalian was born on July 20, 1973 to Carol (née Steloff) and Robert P. Chalian. His father worked as a salesman before his death in 1984, and is of Armenian Jewish heritage.

Chalian attended Marlboro High School in Marlboro Township, New Jersey, where he graduated in 1991. He then attended Northwestern University, earning a bachelor of arts degree.

Career
After graduating from Northwestern, Chalian joined NY1, a 24-hour cable news television channel based in New York City, and produced the nightly news program, Inside City Hall. He then worked as political director for ABC News and appeared as a political analyst on ABC World News Tonight, Nightline, and Good Morning America. At ABC, he created and co-anchored the daily political webcast, "Top Line". In January 2009, he won an Emmy Award as part of the team that produced ABC News's presidential inauguration coverage. He next worked as the political editor and an on-air political analyst for the PBS NewsHour and then as Vice President for Video Programming at Politico.

Yahoo
Chalian served as Yahoo! News' Washington bureau chief but was fired from his position after he was overheard on a live microphone during an online broadcast from the 2012 Republican National Convention saying that Republican presidential candidate Mitt Romney and his wife Ann Romney were "not concerned at all" and "happy to have a party with black people drowning" during Hurricane Isaac. Chalian later apologized for his remarks, saying, "I am profoundly sorry for making an inappropriate and thoughtless joke. I was commenting on the challenge of staging a convention during a hurricane and about campaign optics. I have apologized to the Romney campaign, and I want to take this opportunity to publicly apologize to Gov. and Mrs. Romney."

CNN
After Yahoo, he was hired as political director at CNN replacing Mark Preston. In this role, he oversees the political coverage across all of CNN's platforms. He often appears on-air as a political analyst on New Day and The Situation Room with Wolf Blitzer.

Personal life
Chalian lives in Washington, D.C. He has been married to Justin Tyler Bernstine since 2017. Bernstine serves as assistant dean for undergraduate academic services in the American University School of Communication.

References

External links
 
 

CNN people
Northwestern University alumni
American political journalists
American television reporters and correspondents
American people of Armenian descent
Armenian Jews
Living people
Jewish American journalists
1973 births
Marlboro High School alumni
LGBT people from New Jersey
American LGBT journalists
American LGBT broadcasters
LGBT Jews
21st-century American Jews
21st-century American LGBT people